The National Science and Maths Quiz is an annual science and mathematics content-based national level quiz competition for senior high schools in Ghana. It has been produced by Primetime Limited, an education-interest advertising and public relations agency, since 1993.

The objective of the National Science & Maths Quiz is to promote the study of the sciences and mathematics, help students develop quick thinking and a probing and scientific mind about the everyday world around them, while fostering healthy academic rivalry among senior high schools.

The quiz, originally sponsored by Unilever's"Brillant Soap", is popularly referred to as “Brilla” by many who have gone through the secondary school system and it is one of the few academic events that brings all of Ghana's secondary schools together. The National Science and Maths Quiz is the longest running educational programme on Ghanaian television. It is broadcast on GTV during the quiz season every Saturday at 11am and Wednesdays at 4pm.

History 
The idea for the production of a quiz programme aimed at encouraging the study of the sciences and mathematics was not mooted at a national science fair or conference. It happened on the tennis court of the University of Ghana, Legon in 1993. Kwaku Mensa-Bonsu, then managing director of Primetime, was on the court to play a tennis game with his playmates, the late Professors Marian Ewurama Addy and Ebenezer Kweku Awotwe. Mensa-Bonsu was curious as to why birds could stand on a live electric wire without getting electrocuted, but human beings could not do same. From Awotwe's explanation, Mensa-Bonsu got the idea of putting together a quiz programme on science and mathematics.

When the quiz started, it involved only 32 schools across the country, and these were divided into the Northern Sector and Southern Sector, with 16 schools per sector. Winners in both sectors were then brought to Accra for the national championship. Prempeh College won the maiden edition.

In 1997, the geographical sector system was abandoned, and two northern sector schools (from the old format), Opoku Ware School and Prempeh College made it to the finals where Opoku Ware School won its first trophy.

In 1998, the tournament became known as the National Science & Maths Quiz, when the quiz show lost its original sponsorship from Brillant Soap. Subsequently, in 2012, the Ghana Education Service, through the Conference of Heads of Assisted Secondary Schools (CHASS) took up the sponsorship of the programme. In terms of participation, beginning in 2000, the number of schools was increased to 40. The number of participating schools again, was increased in 2013 to 81, although 66 ultimately showed up for the competition. Thus, the participation format was changed to a three-team contest instead of the two-team contest which had characterized the competition since its inception in 1993. To give the programme a national character, the quiz has since 2014 involved 135 schools from all parts of Ghana. Since 2014, 108 schools are selected from regional and zonal competitions and qualifiers to join 27 seeded schools (quarter-finalists from the previous year's competition) at the National Championships. The NSMQ regions are Greater Accra, Central, Eastern and Ashanti Regions while the zones are Bono-Ahafo, Western, Volta-Oti and Northern Zones.

The first quiz mistress was the late Professor Marian Ewurama Addy, a professor of biochemistry at the University of Ghana, Legon. She was quiz-mistress from 1993 till 2000. “When in 1993/94, during the planning of a televised quiz programme on Science, I was asked to be the Quiz Mistress, I could not say No”, she wrote in her memoir, Rewards: An Autobiography. “I was interested in females becoming scientists and this was an opportunity to invite the young ones to become scientists…I thought that this was a most effective way of being a role model,” she added. In recognition of her contributions to promoting the study of Science and Mathematics among girls through the NSMQ, Prof. Addy was named the Marketing Woman of the Year by the Chartered Institute of Marketing Ghana in 1995.

Eureka Emefa Adomako, a botanist at the University of Ghana, Legon, took over as quiz-mistress from 2001 to 2005, having been recommended by Prof. Addy. Dr. Adomako took charge of the programme until she had to leave for postgraduate studies. Before leaving, just as Prof. Addy recommended her as quiz mistress, Dr. Adomako recommended that Dr. Kaufmann take over as quiz mistress.

In 2006, Dr. Elsie Effah Kaufmann, the founding Head of the Biomedical Engineering Department at the University of Ghana, Legon, took over as quiz mistress. Over the years, she has succeeded in bringing her own style to the programme, occasionally injecting some humour into an otherwise formal programme. As the chairperson of the moderation team, Dr. Kaufmann is supported by a team of consultants made up of Prof. W. A. Asomaning, Dr. Ebenezer Owusu, Dr. Amos Kuditcher and Dr. Douglas Adu-Gyamfi, all of the University of Ghana, Legon.

Presbyterian Boys' Secondary School, (PRESEC-Legon) has been the most successful school in the quiz so far, having been to the finals a record 11 times and winning the competition seven times. Achimota School is the only coeducational school to have won the competition. No all-girls' school has ever won the competition. Only 11 schools in Ghana have won the competition since its inception.

In 2021, Primetime Limited launched the STEM Festival comprising Mentorship Sessions and the Sci-Tech Fair. The Sci-Tech Fair component  includes a Sci-Tech Innovation Challenge and an Exhibition open to Senior High Schools, Basic and Junior High Schools, Tech firms and start-ups.

List of Hosts and Quiz Mistresses
Marian Ewurama Addy, 1993–2000
Eureka Emefa Adomako, 2001–2005
Elsie Effah Kaufmann, 2006–present

Quiz Structure
Three schools compete in each contest and each school is represented by two contestants. The current quiz mistress is Dr. Elsie Effah Kaufmann. Presently, every contest is composed of five rounds with the following rules:

Round 1 — The round of fundamental questions. Each contesting school has to answer 4 Biology, 4 Chemistry, 4 Physics and 4 Mathematics questions.  A wrongly answered question may be carried over as a bonus. Partial credit is sometimes awarded by the quiz mistress.
Round  2 — This round is called the speed race. All three schools are presented with the same mainly applied questions at the same time. A school answers a question by ringing the bell. There are no partial credits at this stage and a school gains a maximum of three points for answering a question correctly.
Round 3 — This round is known as the Problem of the Day. The contestants are required to solve a single question, worth 10 points, within 4 minutes.
Round 4 — True or False statements are given to the contestants in turns. The objective is to determine whether each statement is true or false. A correctly answered question fetches 2 points.  A wrongly answered question attracts a penalty of -1 point. One may decide not to answer a question, in which case it will be carried over to the next contesting school as a bonus for the full benefit of the two points.
Round 5 — Riddles; clues are given to the contesting schools. The schools compete against each other to find the answers to the riddles. Getting the correct answer on the first clue fetches 5 points. On the second clue, 4 points are awarded for a correct answer. On the third or any other subsequent clue, a question answered correctly is given 3 points. There are 4 riddles in all.

List of Past Winners

Ranking 
Here is the league of finalists at the National Science and Math Quiz.

Awards 
TV Programme of the Year, 2017 (CIMG awards)
Six Gold Awards (Branded PR, Digital, Social Media, Print, Integrated Campaign, Television), 15th Advertising Association of Ghana (AAG) Gong Gong Awards, 2021

See also
List of senior secondary schools in Ghana

References

Education in Ghana
High schools in Ghana
Quiz games
Student quiz competitions
Student quiz television series
Youth science
Annual events in Ghana